Winrich Ernst Rudolf Kolbe (9 August 1940 – September 2012), born in Amsterdam, Netherlands, was a German-American television director and television producer  best known for directing 48 episodes of Star Trek across four television series. These included the Hugo Award-winning "All Good Things...", the series finale of Star Trek: The Next Generation. He also directed the series premiere of Star Trek: Voyager, "Caretaker", and was involved in the casting of the series.

Early life
Kolbe was born in Netherlands. He came to the United States to study architecture.

Career

Military service
Kolbe was drafted during the Vietnam War. He served as an artillery spotter in the army.

Television
Following his service in the Military he began his career in television during the 1970s, and he was the associate producer for Battlestar Galactica. He also directed an episode of the series, "Baltar's Escape". Prior to his work on Star Trek, he worked on a variety of series including episodes of Knight Rider and Spenser: For Hire starring Avery Brooks, whom he would go on to direct once again in Star Trek: Deep Space Nine.

Star Trek
Kolbe directed 48 episodes of Star Trek across four series, including The Next Generation (16 episodes), Voyager (18 episodes), Deep Space Nine (13 episodes) and Enterprise (1 episode). These included the series finale of TNG, "All Good Things...", which was awarded the 1995 Hugo Award for Best Dramatic Presentation (long form).

He directed the series premiere of Voyager, "Caretaker", for which he was involved in the casting. One of the most notable issues that he was involved in overseeing was the casting of the Captain, and was one of the staff members pushing for a female Captain against the wishes of Paramount Pictures. He said that "We did make some attempts to look at male actors for the part when time was running out and it seemed that we might have a problem, but every time a male read for Janeway, I couldn't quite get my head into it. There is a difference a woman would bring that we all felt was important." He later said of the casting of Kate Mulgrew after Geneviève Bujold dropped out of the role, "She is very feminine, but she can handle any situation. I would follow her. She really is wonderful."

His sole episode of Enterprise was "Silent Enemy".

Teaching
He worked as a professor at the Savannah College of Art and Design after he retired from directing in 2003 and retired from that post in 2007.

Personal life and death
During the early years of Voyager, he dated Kate Mulgrew for about three years. He died in September 2012 after several years of failing health. Following his death, a Memorial Award in his name was awarded in 2013 as part of the Savannah College of Art and Design's film and television department's SCADemy Awards.

Selected filmography
Ice Planet (2001)

Television director 

 24
 Angel
 Automan
 In the Heat of the Night
 Knight Rider
 Lois & Clark: The New Adventures of Superman
 Magnum, P.I.
 Millennium
 Space: Above and Beyond
 Star Trek: Deep Space Nine
 Star Trek: Enterprise
 Star Trek: The Next Generation
 Star Trek: Voyager
 Tales of the Gold Monkey
 Threat Matrix (as Rick Kolbe)
 Voyagers!
 War of the Worlds
 Hunter

Television producer

 Battlestar Galactica
 McCloud
 Quincy, M.E.

References

External links
 

 Winrich Kolbe at Find a Grave

1940 births
2012 deaths
American film directors
American television directors
American television producers
Burials at Forest Lawn Memorial Park (Hollywood Hills)
German emigrants to the United States
Hugo Award winners
Savannah College of Art and Design faculty